A covering of a topological space  is a continuous map  with special properties.

Definition 

Let  be a topological space.
 
Often, the notion of a covering is used for the covering space  as well as for the map . The open sets  are called sheets, which are uniquely determined up to a homeomorphism if  is connected. The degree of a covering is the cardinality of the space . If  is path-connected, then the covering  is denoted as a path-connected covering.

Examples 

The preimage of  under  is 
  
  
 .

Properties

Local homeomorphism 

It follows that the covering space  and the base space  locally share the same properties.

 If  is a connected and non-orientable manifold, then there is a covering  of degree , whereby  is a connected and orientable manifold.
 If  is a graph, then it follows for a covering  that  is also a graph.
 If  is a connected manifold, then there is a covering , whereby  is a connected and simply connected manifold.

Factorisation 

commutes.

Product of coverings 

Equivalence of coverings 
Both coverings are called equivalent, if there exists a homeomorphism , such that the diagram

commutes. If such a homeomorphism exists, then one calls the covering spaces  and  isomorphic.

Lifting property 
An important property of the covering is, that it satisfies the lifting property, i.e.:

Let  be the unit interval and  be a covering.

Let  be a path-connected space and  be a connected covering.
  with 

is bijective.

If  is a path-connected space and  a connected covering, then the induced group homomorphism 

Branched covering

Definitions

Holomorphic maps between Riemann surfaces 

If  is holomorphic at all , we say  is holomorphic.

If  is a non-constant, holomorphic map between compact Riemann surfaces, then  is surjective and an open map, i.e. for every open set  the image  is also open.

Ramification point and branch point 
Let  be a non-constant, holomorphic map between compact Riemann surfaces. The image point  of a ramification point is called a branch point.

Degree of a holomorphic map 
Let  be a non-constant, holomorphic map between compact Riemann surfaces.

This number is well-defined, since for every  the fiber  is discrete and for any two unramified points , it is: 

It can be calculated by:

Branched covering

Definition 
A continuous map  is called a branched covering, if there exists a closed set with dense complement , such that  is a covering.

Examples 
 Every non-constant, holomorphic map between compact Riemann surfaces  of degree  is a branched covering of degree .

Universal covering

Definition 
Let  be a simply connected covering. If  is another simply connected covering, then there exists a uniquely determined homeomorphism , such that the diagram

commutes.

This means that  is, up to equivalence, uniquely determined and because of that universal property denoted as the universal covering of the space .

Existence 
A universal covering does not always exist, but the following properties guarantee its existence:

Let  be a connected, locally simply connected topological space; then, there exists a universal covering .

Examples 

 A topological space which has no universal covering is the Hawaiian earring:  One can show that no neighborhood of the origin  is simply connected.

G-coverings 
Let G be a discrete group acting on the topological space X. This means that each element g of G is associated to a homeomorphism Hg of X onto itself, in such a way that Hg h is always equal to Hg ∘ Hh for any two elements g and h of G. (Or in other words, a group action of the group G on the space X is just a group homomorphism of the group G into the group Homeo(X) of self-homeomorphisms of X.) It is natural to ask under what conditions the projection from X to the orbit space X/G is a covering map. This is not always true since the action may have fixed points. Thus the study of the relation between the fundamental groups of X and X/G is not so straightforward.

However the group G does act on the fundamental groupoid of X, and so the study is best handled by considering groups acting on groupoids, and the corresponding orbit groupoids. The theory for this is set down in Chapter 11 of the book Topology and groupoids referred to below. The main result is that for discontinuous actions of a group G on a Hausdorff space X which admits a universal cover, then the fundamental groupoid of the orbit space X/G is isomorphic to the orbit groupoid of the fundamental groupoid of X, i.e. the quotient of that groupoid by the action of the group G. This leads to explicit computations, for example of the fundamental group of the symmetric square of a space.

Deck transformation

Definition 
Let  be a covering. A deck transformation is a homeomorphism , such that the diagram of continuous maps

commutes.

If this action is transitive on some fiber, then it is transitive on all fibers, and we call the cover regular (or normal or Galois). Every such regular cover is a principal , where  is considered as a discrete topological group.

Every universal cover  is regular, with deck transformation group being isomorphic to the fundamental group

Examples 
 As another important example, consider  the complex plane and  the complex plane minus the origin. The deck transformations are multiplications with -th roots of unity and the deck transformation group is therefore isomorphic to the cyclic group .

Properties 
Let  be a path-connected space and  be a connected covering. In particular, only the identity map fixes a point in the fiber.

Normal coverings

Definition 
A covering  is called normal, if . This means, that for every  and any two  there exists a deck transformation , such that .

Properties 
Let  be a path-connected space and  be a connected covering.

Let  be a topological space.

Examples 
 Every simply connected covering is a normal covering.

Calculation 
Let  be a group, which acts discontinuously on a topological space  and let  be the normal covering. 

 If  is path-connected, then .

 If  is simply connected, then .

Examples 
 Let .
Then one gets a homeomorphism , which induces a discontinuous group action , whereby . It follows, that the map  is a normal covering of the klein bottle, hence .
Since the group action  is discontinuously, whereby  are coprime, the map  is the universal covering of the lens space , hence .

Galois correspondence 

Let  be a connected and locally simply connected space, then, up to equivalence between coverings, there is a bijection:

For a sequence of subgroups  one gets a sequence of coverings . For a subgroup  with index , the covering  has degree .

Classification

Definitions

Category of coverings 
Let  be a topological space.

commutes.

G-Set 
Let  be a topological group. The category  is the category of sets which are G-sets. The morphisms are G-maps  between G-sets. They satisfy the condition  for every .

Equivalence 
Since  defines, by lifting of paths and evaluating at the endpoint of the lift, a group action on the fiber of a covering, the functor  is an equivalence of categories.

Applications 

An important practical application of covering spaces occurs in charts on SO(3), the rotation group. This group occurs widely in engineering, due to 3-dimensional rotations being heavily used in navigation, nautical engineering, and aerospace engineering, among many other uses. Topologically, SO(3) is the real projective space RP3, with fundamental group Z/2, and only (non-trivial) covering space the hypersphere S3, which is the group Spin(3), and represented by the unit quaternions. Thus quaternions are a preferred method for representing spatial rotations – see quaternions and spatial rotation.

However, it is often desirable to represent rotations by a set of three numbers, known as Euler angles (in numerous variants), both because this is conceptually simpler for someone familiar with planar rotation, and because one can build a combination of three gimbals to produce rotations in three dimensions. Topologically this corresponds to a map from the 3-torus T3 of three angles to the real projective space RP3 of rotations, and the resulting map has imperfections due to this map being unable to be a covering map. Specifically, the failure of the map to be a local homeomorphism at certain points is referred to as gimbal lock, and is demonstrated in the animation at the right – at some points (when the axes are coplanar) the rank of the map is 2, rather than 3, meaning that only 2 dimensions of rotations can be realized from that point by changing the angles. This causes problems in applications, and is formalized by the notion of a covering space.

See also 
 Bethe lattice is the universal cover of a Cayley graph
 Covering graph, a covering space for an undirected graph, and its special case the bipartite double cover
 Covering group
 Galois connection
 Quotient space (topology)

Literature

References 

Algebraic topology
Homotopy theory
Fiber bundles
Topological graph theory